Matthew Ryan Hoge (born 1974) is an American writer and film director, known for writing and directing The United States of Leland (2003).

Biography 
Hoge was raised in the northern Denver suburb of Thornton, Colorado. He attended Horizon High School, where he participated in the school's theatre program and was introduced to the philosophy of Albert Camus. Hoge earned a BFA in Writing for Film and Television from the USC School of Cinema-Television in 1996.

Works 
Self Storage (1999)
The United States of Leland (2003)

References

External links 

Interviews:

1974 births
USC School of Cinematic Arts alumni
Living people
People from Thornton, Colorado
Film directors from Colorado